The Port of Istanbul, also known as the Port of Haydarpaşa, is the container port for Istanbul, Turkey, on the Asian side of the Bosphorus, close to Haydarpaşa Station.

See also
Galataport

References

Buildings and structures in Istanbul
Istanbul
1900 establishments in the Ottoman Empire
Transport infrastructure completed in 1900
Tourism in Istanbul
Beyoğlu
Ports and harbours of Turkey